Montebello/Commerce station is a Metrolink train station located at 2000 Flotilla Street in Montebello, California. Metrolink's Riverside Line trains between Los Angeles Union Station and Riverside–Downtown station stop here.  It is owned and operated by the City of Montebello.

The city also provides a shuttle, called Montebello Link, designed to connect Metrolink passengers with major employment centers. There are approximately 267 parking spaces available.

In September 2012, the Montebello City Council approved a $537,000 beautification project to upgrade the station, which had not been upgraded since its construction in 1997.

References

External links 

City of Montebello Transportation

Metrolink stations in Los Angeles County, California
Montebello, California
Railway stations in the United States opened in 1997
1997 establishments in California